Jacob Abrahamsz. Dissius (1653 - 1695) was a Dutch typographer and printer. He is most notable as an art collector and for his links to Johannes Vermeer - his collection included 21 Vermeer works (including The Milkmaid, Portrait of a Young Woman, A Girl Asleep, Woman Holding a Balance and The Music Lesson) and in 1680 he married Madgdalene, daughter and sole heir of Vermeer's main patron Pieter van Ruijven. Dissius died in 1695 and his collection was auctioned off in Amsterdam the following year.

Biography
Jacob Dissius was baptised on 23 November 1653 in Delft as the son of Maria Cloeting and the printer Abraham Dissius. He married Magdalena Pieters van Ruijven, daughter of Pieter van Ruijven, born in 1655. Dissius' father-in-law was one of the wealthier citizens of Delft, and became a patron of Vermeer. She inherited her parents' money and art collection after the death of her mother in 1681. When she died childless in 1682, he inherited her collection of Vermeer paintings and other works of art.

Jacob Dissius died in October 1695 (he was buried on 14 October), and his art collection was sold on 16 May 1696 by art dealer Gerard Hoet in Amsterdam.

Art collection
Three documents are crucial in reconstructing the art collection of Jacob Dissius: the inventory of his estate in April 1683, after the death of his parents-in-law and his wife; a document listing the division of this inheritance between Jacob and his father Abraham Dissius, which was united in Jacob's possession after the death of his father in 1694; and the list of the auction of his collection after his death in October 1695.

Jan Vermeer
Of the 21 paintings by Vermeer in the Dissius auction of 1696, 15 are usually matched to currently known paintings, while 6 others are either lost or unidentified.

Identified works
A Girl Asleep
Officer and Laughing Girl
The Little Street
Woman Holding a Balance
The Milkmaid
View of Delft
The Lacemaker
Woman with a Pearl Necklace
A Lady Writing a Letter
Lady Standing at a Virginal or Lady Seated at a Virginal (the other was owned at the same time by Diego Duarte)
The Girl with the Wine Glass
Girl Interrupted at Her Music or The Concert
The Guitar Player
Mistress and Maid or Girl Reading a Letter at an Open Window
The Music Lesson

Vermeer paintings now considered lost or unidentified
Portrait of Vermeer with Various Accessories (sometimes thought to be The Art of Painting (Vermeer))
Seigneur Washing his Hands
A View of a House Standing in Delft
A Tronie in Antique Dress (sometimes thought to be Girl with a Red Hat) and two other tronies (perhaps Portrait of a Young Woman (Vermeer, New York) and Girl with a Pearl Earring)

Others
A seascape by Jan Porcellis
Four landscapes by Simon de Vlieger
Three church paintings by Emanuel de Witte
A tronie by Rembrandt
A portrait of Erasmus

Notes

External links
Sale catalogue

1653 births
1695 deaths
Dutch art collectors
Dutch printers
Johannes Vermeer
People from Delft